Ward Sutton is an American illustrator, cartoonist and writer born in Minneapolis and based in Fort Collins, Colorado. His comic strip, "Sutton Impact" (formerly "Schlock 'n' Roll"), was published in The Village Voice from 1995 to 2007. In 2018, Sutton won the Herblock Prize for his work.

Career
Sutton has contributed cartoons and illustrations to the op-ed pages of The New York Times and to Rolling Stone, Time, The Nation, Entertainment Weekly and The New Yorker. He also illustrates and writes a parody cartoon for The Onion under the pseudonym of "Stan Kelly", depicting the wrong-headed one-panels of an ultraconservative middle-aged cartoonist. According to Onion President Sean Mills in an interview with Wikinews, the cartoon has generated "a lot of heat." "He has a very unique take on what is going on in the world," said Mills, "and it does tend to upset some people, but that's the job of an editorial cartoonist, to be a provocateur."

In addition to his work for print media, Sutton designed the animation for the opening credits of the television show Strangers with Candy, and has created animation for HBO, VH-1, and TV Land. He has also designed silk-screened posters for a variety of musical acts, including Beck, Radiohead, Phish, and Pearl Jam.

Sutton drew a 2017 editorial cartoon critical of a tax cut for millionaires, choosing to depict Sheldon Adelson,  who is Jewish, in a manner that some commentators found anti-Semitic.

In the 1990s Sutton worked for some time as editorial cartoonist at High Times Magazine.

Personal life
After living in New York City for many years, Sutton and his wife decided to move to Costa Rica, where they stayed for two years before deciding to move to Fort Collins, Colorado.

References

External links
 Sutton Impact Studio
 The Village Voice Weekly cartoon
 Mother Jones Biography of Mark and Ward Sutton
 2005 radio interview with Ward Sutton
 List of Sutton's work for Mad Magazine

American cartoonists
Artists from Minneapolis
Artists from New York City
Living people
Mad (magazine) cartoonists
The New Yorker cartoonists
St. Olaf College alumni
The Onion people
Year of birth missing (living people)